Académie Sportive Moulins Football, commonly known as AS Moulins or simply Moulins, is a French football club based in Moulins. The club was founded in 1927 as Association Sportive Moulins Football 03 Auvergne, and was reborn under the current name in 2016 after the original club filed for bankruptcy. Moulins play at the Stade Hector Rolland, which has a capacity of 1,000, and the club colours are white and blue.

Current squad

Honours
 Division d'Honneur Auvergne: 1931, 1934, 1935, 1938, 1940, 1960, 1968, 1992, 2000

References

External links
  

Association football clubs established in 1927
Sport in Allier
1927 establishments in France
Moulins, Allier
Football clubs in Auvergne-Rhône-Alpes